Roger Williamson (2 February 1948 – 29 July 1973) was a British racing driver, a two time British Formula 3 champion, who died during his second Formula One race, the 1973 Dutch Grand Prix at Zandvoort Circuit in the Netherlands.

Biography
Williamson was born in Ashby-de-la-Zouch, Leicestershire. He won the 1971 and 1972 British Formula 3 Championship titles. In 1973, he was offered a drive in the March Engineering works Formula One team. Williamson originally tested for the BRM team, but his manager advised him to take the March offer, as March had a slightly stronger performance in the previous season.

Death

After his Formula One debut at the 1973 British Grand Prix, Williamson's second Formula One appearance was at the 1973 Dutch Grand Prix at Zandvoort Circuit. On his eighth lap, a suspected tyre failure at the high speed esses near the Tunnel Oost (East Tunnel) caused his car to flip upside down and catch fire. Williamson had not been seriously injured by the impact, but was trapped under the car which was swiftly engulfed in flames. The track marshals were both poorly trained and badly equipped, and did not assist him. Another driver, David Purley, upon witnessing the crash of his friend, abandoned his own race and pulled over in a desperate and valiant attempt to rescue Williamson. He ran across the still active track to Williamson's car and tried to turn it upright, before grabbing a fire extinguisher from a marshal and returning to the engulfed car. He emptied it on the car and signalled for others to help. Purley's efforts to turn the car upright and extinguish the flames were in vain, and the marshals were unable to handle the vehicle without flame retardant overalls. Purley later stated he could hear Williamson's screams from underneath the car, but by the time the first fire engine arrived and the fire was extinguished, Williamson had died of asphyxiation. As most racers mistakenly identified Purley as the driver of the crashed car, and therefore thought the burning car to be empty, none of them stopped to help and the race continued, even as Purley stood on the circuit and gestured with his hands for them to stop. Furthermore, the track marshals were wearing normal blazers and not the fire-resistant overalls which the drivers wore, and thus were not able to go near the large flames. Purley was later awarded the George Medal for the bravery he displayed in attempting to rescue Williamson. A series of photos of the incident, showing a clearly desperate and ultimately dejected Purley, won that year's World Press Photo award for Photo Sequences. Williamson's body was later cremated with his ashes being taken to an undisclosed location. In the years following the accident, fire-resistant clothing would become mandatory for all trackside marshals so that they would be able to assist in the event of a fire. The next few years also saw a noticeable increase in drivers stopping at accident sites to assist in rescue efforts, notably at the 1976 German Grand Prix. Williamson was 25 years old at the time of his death.

In 2003, on the thirtieth anniversary of his fatal crash, a bronze statue of Williamson was unveiled at the Donington Park circuit in his native Leicestershire. Then-owner Tom Wheatcroft had provided financial backing to Williamson, and described the day Williamson died as "the saddest day of my life".

Racing record

Complete Formula One World Championship results
(key)

Non-Championship Formula One results
(key)

References

Books

External links

 Roger Williamson Biography
 Formula One World
 Roger Williamson's Fatal Accident – Zandvoort 29 July, A pictorial record – World Press Photo
 

English racing drivers
English Formula One drivers
March Formula One drivers
European Formula Two Championship drivers
British Formula Three Championship drivers
Racing drivers who died while racing
People from Ashby-de-la-Zouch
Sportspeople from Leicestershire
1973 deaths
1948 births
Filmed deaths in motorsport
Sport deaths in the Netherlands
Deaths from asphyxiation